High Dar Wood is a small woodland in the hamlet of Linwood in the parish of Stixwould and Woodhall, Lincolnshire. It is approximately a fifth of a mile north of the slightly smaller Low Dar Wood.

Forests and woodlands of Lincolnshire